Anita Sokołowska (born 25 January 1976) is a Polish theatrical, movie and television actress.

Sokołowska graduated from the National Film School in Łódź in 1999. She is best known for the role of doctor Lena Starska in Na dobre i na złe, a show that she has been appearing in since 2004. Apart from the below titles, she has appeared in about twenty different theatre-plays.

Filmography
 2004-still: Na dobre i na złe (TV-series) .... as dr Lena Starska
 2007: Testosteron .... as Kornel's mother
 2006: Autonaprawa
 2006: Mokre bajeczka (short cartoon)
 2006: Fałszerze - Powrót Sfory (TV-miniseries) .... as Anita Nowicka
 2005: Pensjonat pod Różą (TV-series) .... as Alina (guest-appearance, x2)
 2005: Klinika samotnych serc (TV-series) .... as Grażyna Broniecka (guest-appearance, x2)
 2004: Czego biją się faceci, czyli seks w mniejszym mieście (TV-series) .... as Joanna Wysocka (guest appearance)
 2003: Polowanie
 2003: Na dobre i na złe (TV-series) .... as Matylda Różańska (guest-appearance)
 2003: Miodowe lata (TV-series) .... as Hania Kalicka (guest-appearance)
 2003: Kasia i Tomek (TV-series) .... as Psychologist (guest-appearance)
 2001: Znajomi z widzenia
 2001: Domek dla Julii
 2001: 0 : 13
 2000: Sfora (TV-miniseries) .... as Anita Nowicka
 1999-2000: Trędowata (TV-series) .... as Stefcia Rudecka / Zuzanna Korab-Rudecka
 1999: Historia jednego dnia

References

External links
 
Profiles at Filmpolski.pl
Profile at e-teatr.pl

1976 births
Łódź Film School alumni
Polish television actresses
Polish film actresses
Living people
Actors from Lublin
Actors from Bydgoszcz